Victor John Emery (16 May 1934 – 18 July 2002) was a British specialist on superconductors and superfluidity. His model for the electronic structure of the copper-oxide planes is the starting point for many analyses of high-temperature superconductors and is commonly known as the Emery model.

Biography

Early life
Emery was born in Boston, Lincolnshire, England, where he was educated at Staniland School and Boston Grammar School. He won the Parry Gold Medal for the best scholar in 1951 before going on to study physics at the University of Hull, the University of London and the University of Manchester, where he gained a PhD in Theoretical Physics.

At school Emery was a keen swimmer and the star goal-scorer of the Boston water polo team. He also won the town's one mile swimming race on the River Witham on more than one occasion

Career in Theoretical Physics
After completing his studies at Manchester he spent two years as a research associate at Cavendish Laboratory in Cambridge. He was a Fellow at the University of California, Berkeley until 1960. While at Berkeley in 1960, together with Andrew Sessler, he made the prediction that liquid helium-3 would experience superfluidity, flowing without friction, at temperatures very close to absolute zero. The theory was later confirmed experimentally. At this stage he returned to the United Kingdom where he spent some time as a lecturer at the University of Birmingham.

As a result of his work at Berkeley, Emery was invited to join the Brookhaven National Laboratory's Physics Department in 1964. After joining BNL he worked on fundamental theories for the behaviour of helium-3/helium-4 mixtures and later turned to the theory of organic conductors and superconductors. He provided insights into general many-body aspects of boson and fermion systems. Through this work, Emery became one of the world's leading theorists in the study of phase transitions, where substances change state between liquid, solid and gas.

Emery's work with low-temperature superconductivity laid the foundation for his concentration over the next nine years on the theory of high-temperature superconductivity. Discovered in 1986, high-temperature superconductors have the potential to bring superconducting technology into everyday use.

Emery presented one of the first believable theories, identifying the nature of the superconducting material's 'holes', which are the carriers of the supercurrent. He correctly stated that the holes tend to sit mainly on oxygen, rather than on copper, contrary to initial popular belief. His model for the electronic structure of the copper-oxide planes is the starting point for many analyses of high-temperature superconductors and is commonly known as the Emery model.

Victor Emery received tenure at Brookhaven National Laboratory in 1967 and was named Senior Physicist in 1972. In the Physics Department he led the Cryogenics Group from 1973 to 1977 and the Solid State Theory Group from 1975 to 1984 and again from 1994. He also served as Associate chairman from 1981 to 1985. Internationally recognised as one of the world's leading physicists, he won the BNL Distinguished Research and Development Award in 1996.

The 1996 Nobel Prize in Physics was won by David Lee, Douglas D. Osheroff and Robert Richardson of Cornell University for their 1972 discovery that the isotope helium-3 can become superfluid at a temperature of 0.002 kelvin, very close to absolute zero. Their prize-winning research was sparked by the paper Victor Emery and Andrew Sessler had written in 1960.

In 1997 Emery gave the 326th Brookhaven lecture, entitled 'High Temperature Superconductors – The First Ten Years' illustrating his points with simple, non-technical terms. He explained how key experiments at BNL had led to deeper insights into the atomic structure and forces of electricity and magnetism, that underlie the mechanisms of high-temperature superconductivity. To give an example of the Meissner effect, one part of his basic research, he showed how a 200-kilogram Japanese Sumo wrestler could float inches off the ground on a thin magnet.

In 2001 Emery (with Alan H. Luther) won the Oliver E. Buckley Prize in Condensed Matter Physics for his "fundamental contribution to the theory of interacting electrons in a one-dimension". The theory is believed to be of crucial importance for understanding high temperature superconductors.

On 13 October 2001 the American Academy of Arts and Sciences, welcomed 185 new Fellows at a ceremony at their headquarters in Cambridge, Massachusetts. Those new fellows included Richard Avedon, Paul Newman, Joanne Woodward, Riley Bechtel, Woody Allen, Madeleine Albright, King Juan Carlos I of Spain, and Victor Emery.

Death
By 2002, he had been suffering from motor neuron disease for two years. The progressive debility interfered with his work until finally he could no longer go to his office. He died on 18 July of that year.

Further reading

External links
 Victor John Emery
 Nobel Prize has Berkeley Roots
 Charge Inhomogeneity in Correlated Electron Systems

1933 births
2002 deaths
People from Boston, Lincolnshire
People educated at Boston Grammar School
Alumni of the University of London
Alumni of the University of Hull
Alumni of the University of Manchester
English physicists
Fellows of the American Physical Society
Oliver E. Buckley Condensed Matter Prize winners
Neurological disease deaths in New York (state)
Deaths from motor neuron disease